Abdul Rahman (born 22 November 2001) is an Afghan cricketer. He made his first-class debut on 16 April 2019, for Kabul Region in the 2019 Ahmad Shah Abdali 4-day Tournament. He made his Twenty20 debut on 13 October 2019, for Kabul Eagles in the 2019 Shpageeza Cricket League.

In December 2019, he was named in Afghanistan's squad for the 2020 Under-19 Cricket World Cup. In July 2021, Abdul was named in Afghanistan's One Day International (ODI) squad for their series against Pakistan. He made his List A debut on 17 October 2021, for Band-e-Amir Region in the 2021 Ghazi Amanullah Khan Regional One Day Tournament.

References

External links
 

2001 births
Living people
Afghan cricketers
Band-e-Amir Dragons cricketers
Kabul Eagles cricketers
Place of birth missing (living people)